The Sea Fisheries (Shellfish) Amendment (Scotland) Act is an Act of the Scottish Parliament which amends section 7(4) of the Sea Fisheries (Shellfish) Act 1967 in respect of rights of several fishery.

Background
The original Bill was introduced in the Scottish Parliament on 8 March 2000 by Tavish Scott MSP. The existing Sea Fisheries (Shellfish) Act 1967 required that a shellfish farmer seeking a Several Order to allow them to control an area of seabed on which to farm shellfish frequently encountered opposition from fishermen who fish in the area to be covered by the Order. If the Several Order was issued, all fishing was banned within the area covered, regardless of whether or not the fishing operations damaged the interests of the shellfish farmer.

The amendment to the 1967 Act allows Scottish Ministers making a Several Order to authorise the continuation of specified non-damaging fishing operations
within the area covered by the Order. The aim of the Bill was thus to avoid unnecessary and avoidable conflicts of interests between shellfish farmers and fishermen.

Provision
The purpose of the Bill was to permit Scottish Ministers to authorise the use by fishermen of non-damaging types of fishing gear such as creels in areas covered by Several
Fisheries Orders. Thus, in section 7 of the Sea Fisheries (Shellfish) Act 1967 (c.83) (protection of fisheries), in subsection (4)(a), after sub-paragraph (ii) there was inserted:

"or

(iii) in the case of several fishery, an implement of a type specified in the order and so used as not to disturb or injure in any manner shellfish of the description in question."

Passage through Parliament
The Sea Fisheries (Shellfish) Amendment (Scotland) Act 2000 asp 12 was passed by the Scottish Parliament on 28 September 2000. The bill was given the Royal Assent on 2 November 2000.

See also
Fisheries Act

References

External links

Sea Fisheries Legislation, The Scottish Government, 25 August 2003
Sea Fisheries Information, The Scottish Government
Marine Scotland, the Scottish Government’s marine management directorate

2000 in the environment
Acts of the Scottish Parliament 2000
Fisheries law
Fishing in Scotland
Scottish coast